Bəyimli (also, Begimli) is a village and municipality in the Zardab Rayon of Azerbaijan.  It has a population of 830.

References 

World Gazetteer: Azerbaijan – World-Gazetteer.com

Populated places in Zardab District